The electrocaloric effect is a phenomenon in which a material shows a reversible temperature change under an applied electric field. It is often considered to be the physical inverse of the pyroelectric effect.  It should not be confused with the Thermoelectric effect (specifically, the Peltier effect), in which a temperature difference occurs when a current is driven through an electric junction with two dissimilar conductors.

The underlying mechanism of the effect is not fully established; in particular, different textbooks give conflicting explanations. However, as with any isolated (adiabatic) temperature change, the effect comes from the voltage raising or lowering the entropy of the system. (The magnetocaloric effect is an analogous, but better-known and understood, phenomenon.)

Electrocaloric materials were the focus of significant scientific interest in the 1960s and 1970s, but were not commercially exploited as the electrocaloric effects were insufficient for practical applications, the highest response being 2.5 degrees Celsius under an applied potential of 750 volts.

In March 2006 it was reported in the journal Science that thin films of the material PZT (a mixture of lead, titanium, oxygen and zirconium) showed the strongest electrocalorific response yet reported, with the materials cooling down by as much as ~12 K (12 °C) for an electric field change of 480 kV/cm, at an ambient temperature of 220 °C (430 °F). The device structure consisted of a thin film (PZT) on top of a much thicker substrate, but the figure of 12 K represents the cooling of the thin film only. The net cooling of such a device would be lower than 12 K due to the heat capacity of the substrate to which it is attached.

Along the same lines, in 2008, it was shown that a ferroelectric polymer can also achieve 12 K of cooling, nearer room temperature.

With these new, larger responses, practical applications may be more likely, such as in computer cooling or batteries.

References

Further reading
  

Cooling technology
Heat pumps
Electric and magnetic fields in matter